Damage is the name of two fictional characters appearing in comic books published by DC Comics.

The Grant Emerson version of Damage first appeared in a comic book of the same name during the Zero Hour crisis. He is the son of the original Atom, Al Pratt. He has been a member of the Titans, the Freedom Fighters, and the Justice Society of America. The 2nd Damage, Ethan Avery Jr., appeared later in Damage (vol. 2) #1.

Publication history
The Grant Emerson version of Damage first appeared in Damage #1 and was created by Tom Joyner PhD and Bill Marimon.

The Ethan Avery Jr. version of Damage first appeared in Damage (vol. 2) #1 and was created by Robert Venditti and Tony S. Daniel. Critics have observed a similarity between the new Damage and Marvel Comics' Hulk.

Fictional character biography

Grant Emerson
High school student Grant Emerson had just moved with his parents to a new home in suburban Atlanta. His parents moved often due to their work for the Symbolix Corporation, and Grant usually felt like an outsider among other kids. At his new school, Grant suddenly discovers he is a metahuman with incredible strength and the ability to produce explosive blasts when he accidentally levels his entire school. During the Zero Hour crisis, Grant's powers became the spark that restarted the universe after it was destroyed by Parallax; thanks to Damage's powers, the new universe evolved along natural lines, guided by nature rather than the will of Parallax.

A superhero/supervillain battle, involving Baron Blitzkrieg, Iron Munro, and others, results in extensive damage to downtown Atlanta. Damage is arrested for his part in the extensive damage. Sarge Steel is able to cut a deal for him: he would be banned from Georgia for the rest of his life and remanded into the custody of the then-federally sponsored Titans team, led by Arsenal (formerly Speedy, Green Arrow's sidekick). Around this time, Damage deals emotionally with the murder, at the hands of a supervillain, of a schoolmate he cares for. After a while, Damage leaves the Titans to find his origins.

He learns that Vandal Savage was involved in an experiment at Symbolix called Project: Telemachus, where he took DNA samples he had collected from various superheroes and injected them into a fitting vessel: Grant. The heroes that Grant shares DNA with are: Atom (Al Pratt), Flash (Jay Garrick), Green Lantern (Alan Scott), Wildcat (Ted Grant), Hawkman (Carter Hall), Hawkgirl (Shayera Hol), Hourman (Rex Tyler), Black Canary (Dinah Drake), Doctor Mid-Nite (Charles McNider), Starman (Ted Knight), Miss America (Joan Dale), Johnny Quick (Johnny Chambers), Liberty Belle (Libby Lawrence), Martian Manhunter (J'onn J'onzz/John Jones), Flash (Barry Allen), Aquaman, Black Canary (Dinah Laurel Lance), Green Lantern (Hal Jordan) and Atom (Ray Palmer). Symbolix was allied with Shadowspire through Shadowspire's leader Baron Blitzkrieg. The Baron became a recurring foe in Damage's ongoing series, beginning with issue #3. Grant eventually learns that he is the son of Al Pratt, the original Atom and his wife Mary. Grant is forced to go underground after leaving the Titans, since he violated his parole by doing so.

When the original five Titans reformed the group, Arsenal nominates Damage for membership. Arsenal managed to erase Grant's criminal records, so he was no longer a fugitive, and Grant joins the team. Grant participates in multiple adventures, including a confrontation with demons from Hell in Day of Judgment #1. Later, Damage confronts something he had buried for a long time: he had been a victim of abuse at the hands of his foster father. After opening up to Roy Harper (Arsenal's real name), Grant takes a leave of absence and seeks peace and healing on the Navajo reservation where Roy was raised as a child until he became the ward of Green Arrow.

He helps the current Justice Society of America against Imperiex and the villainous team of Obsidian, Eclipso, and Mordru, both times as part of a modern All-Star Squadron. He has since been seen with a new team of government-sponsored Freedom Fighters, whose activities are as yet unknown. He also has something of a brotherly relationship with Atom Smasher, the godson of his father, the original Atom. It was thought that Grant had a brother, Walter, who was recently killed by Walter's superhero daughter, Manhunter, a.k.a. Kate Spencer. However, Walter is actually the son of Iron Munro and Phantom Lady — an odd parallel to Damage's paternity search, as at one stage it appeared that Grant might be the couple's child.

Several members of the modern Freedom Fighters team are killed by the Injustice Society in Infinite Crisis #1. Damage is one of the survivors, though his face is later revealed to have been severely scarred by Zoom.

Damage appears in the relaunched Justice Society of America released in December 2006. He wears a full mask and a costume similar to that of his father and Atom Smasher, featuring a biohazard symbol. He also has a significantly gruffer and more cynical attitude, partly because, as the villain Rebel insinuates, Damage was left badly scarred, but alive, by Zoom. Zoom later encounters the Justice Society, claiming to have maimed, but not killed, the boy intentionally, to give him a defining tragedy, and the fight leads to Georgia. Damage leaps into the state, despite his ban from entering, catches up with Zoom, and holds him hostage. Liberty Belle calms Damage down, but Zoom escapes and hurls debris at his face with the intent to kill him. Liberty Belle speeds in, saves Damage, and knocks out Zoom. When the police are ready to arrest Damage for violating his ban, the Justice Society stands up for him and he is released, but it is not yet known if this action has caused the ban to be dropped. Damage remained on the team, essentially in Atom Smasher's place (Jakeem Thunder's Thunderbolt has even called him "Atom Smasher Two" jokingly).

Damage's face is later healed by the reborn Gog. This is enough to restore his former cheerful and outgoing personality, pushing him to attempt making contact with Sonia Sato, the new Judomaster. Since neither of them can understand the language spoken by the other (Grant does not know Japanese, while Judomaster cannot speak or understand more than a few words of English), their relationship is difficult, but the ongoing attraction is there (later it is implied that they are "together" in some romantic way). When the JSA learns that Gog transformed a group of people who would harm others into trees and intends to keep overkill from punishing the wicked, they are divided on the subject. Grant and Judomaster, among others, side with Gog, and keep the rest of the JSA from trying to stop him.

Damage is then sent back to America to preach the will of Gog to the masses, showing a fanatical devotion to the Old God and a strong streak of vanity about his improved looks, to the point where he concludes that even Cyclone and Stargirl just want to talk to him because he is handsome. When the concerned Stargirl is sent to speak with him, and asks him to rethink his feelings about Gog, he instead attacks her after she accuses him of hiding behind the new 'mask' of his healed face as opposed to his original scars. Atom Smasher defeats Damage in combat and brings him to Al Pratt's home. Damage was prompted to renounce Gog, and learn by the example of Al Pratt, who, despite suffering borderline dwarfism - a height handicap that was a matter of ridicule in the early days of his membership in the original Justice Society until he received his powers - led a simple lifestyle and had a fulfilling existence. Instead, he renounces Al Pratt, blowing up his home and the records of his adventures and claiming to have always been abandoned by him, while Gog will be always at his side. Called by Magog, he rejoins Gog, but there he is asked to kneel and show him his devotion (and expecting the rest of his followers to do the same). When some question this request, Gog becomes angry, even going as far as to threaten them.

The rest of the JSA arrive, having learned from Sandman that Gog is rooting himself into Earth, and if he remains for one more day, Earth will die if he ever leaves; this leaves them with the one option of killing Gog and separating his head from Earth, which is the only way to save the planet. The other Society members following Gog attempt to protect him, until they see him attempt to attack a Society member. All of the followers take up the fight, and Gog punishes them all by taking away his blessings as he threatened, including Damage's restored face, leaving him inconsolable. In retaliation, Damage unleashes a full-power blast against Gog, with little effect. Eventually, Gog is destroyed and the split in the Society is healed. After Gog's defeat, Damage, pained over losing his face again, attempts to push away Judomaster, only for her to kiss him, showing him that it does not matter what he looks like; she is attracted to him, not his face.

During the Blackest Night event, the JSA were attacked by their fallen members, now reanimated as Black Lanterns. Damage was saved from Black Lantern Al Pratt by Atom, but was then killed by Black Lantern Jean Loring. His death and the subsequent collection of his heart was the final one needed to bring about the rise of Nekron. Atom then made a futile attempt to stop one of the black power rings from turning Damage's corpse into a Black Lantern before Loring uses her own technology to shrink him, Mera, and herself into the fully transformed Damage's ring.

While the other Black Lanterns continue their assault on the JSA headquarters, Damage claims that he has retained his original personality and mind and is not influenced by Nekron and his Corps. While he does supposedly sacrifice himself in order to destroy the other Black Lanterns (Mister Terrific says that Damage's explosions do not necessarily harm him and that he was probably still "alive") his sacrifice also allows Lois Lane from Earth-2 to reanimate her deceased husband, with Mister Terrific saying that he knew they had found a way to outsmart them, implying Damage was in fact just another ruse of the Black Lanterns.

Following the Blackest Night, a funeral for Damage is held, attended by the JSA and with Judomaster doing the eulogy for Damage. It is then revealed that Damage, having foreseen his death by one of Sand's prophetic dreams, had recorded his last will for Judomaster, wishing her a better life, and revealing he had planned, in the attempt of giving her a happier life, to get cosmetic surgery on his scarred face. Spurred by his will, Sonia Sato decides to fund anonymously several relief funds for the victims of collateral damage caused by Grant's powers, thus giving him closure and a legacy.

In the "Watchmen" sequel "Doomsday Clock", Damage appeared with the Justice Society of America when Doctor Manhattan undoes the experiment that erased the Justice Society of America and the Legion of Super-Heroes.

During the Dark Nights: Death Metal storyline, Damage was with the Justice Society when the good guys and bad guys were preparing for the final battle against Perpetua and the Darkest Knight.

Ethan Avery
DC introduced a new version of Damage as part of its The New Age of DC Heroes promotion in the form of US army recruit Ethan "Elvis" Avery Jr. He was turned into "a living weapon of mass destruction" through the Damage Project who, on a daily basis, becomes a hulking monster for one hour at a time. After breaking free from his confinement following a mission against the Modoran Separatist Army, Damage went on a rampage in Atlanta, Georgia before going into hiding.

After waking up in a homeless shelter, Avery saw the news about Damage and went outside to calm himself down. His position was tracked down by Task Force XL (a variation of the Suicide Squad consisting of Akando, Deadshot, Giganta, Harley Quinn, Parasite, and Solomon Grundy) where they have orders to capture him. When Ethan tries to talk them out of attacking, Parasite was the first to attack where he starts to absorb his lifeforce until he collapses from absorbing too much energy. Ethan suddenly transforms into Damage and attacks Task Force XL. After easily defeating Task Force XL, Damage was confronted by Wonder Woman who advises Task Force XL to step aside and let her deal with Damage.

Wonder Woman fights Damage and uses her magic lasso on him where she learned that Damage is actually a man. Upon breaking free, Damage threw Wonder Woman into a tree and collapsed a building to get away when his time limit is up. Wonder Woman later informs the Justice League about her fight with Damage. Batman promises to continue to investigate the origin of Damage. The next morning, Ethan is at a coffee shop where he sees the news about Damage. Ethan decides to leave the city.

Powers and abilities
The Grant Emerson version of Damage can generate a power charge that enhances his strength, durability, speed, and reflexes to superhuman levels. If he does not use the energy in the aforementioned manner he is forced to expend it in a discharge, most notably the time he started another Big Bang during Zero Hour (although he only gained the energy necessary to do this thanks to other heroes such as Green Lantern, the Ray and Waverider absorbing and converting Parallax's energy into something that he could then process). The aged Damage in Young Justice: Sins of Youth had the ability to fly. While the current Damage cannot harness this ability yet, he can "leap" by firing his energy at the ground, sometimes traveling great distances, as shown most recently in Justice Society of America #8. At one point in his ongoing series, it is implied that he potentially possesses all of the powers of the heroes whose DNA he shares. Towards the end of his ongoing series, a middle-aged man in unusual clothes is shown several times quietly observing Grant. Although the series was canceled before this plotline could be addressed, it is strongly implied that this man was a future version of Grant and he is shown possessing powers, including flight, which the current version of Damage does not.

The Ethan Avery version of Damage can become a hulking monster for one hour at a time. In this form, he has super-strength enough to leap great distances and rival the strengths of Solomon Grundy and Wonder Woman. Damage has enhanced durability where he is resistant to blades, bullets, rockets, and falling from several hundred feet from the air. Besides his power limitation, a side effect of his abilities is that Ethan developed a dual personality where his Damage side fights to trigger Ethan's transformation.

References

External links
 Damage at DCU Guide

Comics characters introduced in 1994
Comics characters introduced in 2018
DC Comics characters who can move at superhuman speeds
DC Comics characters with superhuman strength
DC Comics male superheroes
DC Comics metahumans
DC Comics orphans
Fictional characters from Atlanta
Fictional genetically engineered characters
Superheroes who are adopted